The 1975–76 1. Slovenská národná hokejová liga season was the 7th season of the 1. Slovenská národná hokejová liga, the second level of ice hockey in Czechoslovakia alongside the 1. Česká národní hokejová liga. 12 teams participated in the league, and TJ Lokomotíva Bučina Zvolen won the championship. TJ Spartak BEZ Bratislava relegated.

Regular season

Standings

Qualification to 1976–77 Czechoslovak Extraliga

 TJ Gottwaldov – TJ Lokomotíva Bučina Zvolen 4–3 (6–0, 4–2, 1–4, 1–3, 5–3, 1–4, 4–2)
 TJ Gottwaldov won the series 4–3 and qualified to 1976–77 Czechoslovak Extraliga.

References

External links
 Season on avlh.sweb.cz (PDF)
 Season on hokejpoprad.sk

Czech
1st. Slovak National Hockey League seasons
2